Murphy Hill Brook is a river in Delaware County in New York. It flows into the Pepacton Reservoir east-northeast of Downsville.

References

Rivers of New York (state)
Rivers of Delaware County, New York